Caitlin De Wit (born 19 June 1987) is a 3.0 point Australian wheelchair basketball player. She was part of the  Australia women's national wheelchair basketball team at the Osaka Cup in Japan in February 2013, and the Asia-Oceania Zone Qualifiers in Bangkok in November 2013. She played with the Hills Hornets team that won the Women's National Wheelchair basketball League (WNWBL) championship title in 2007, 2008 and 2009, and the Sydney University Flames team that won it in 2010.

Personal 
Caitlin De Wit was born on 19 June 1987, and grew up on the Central Coast of New South Wales. She attended Central Coast Grammar School, and then Charles Sturt University, where she studied for a Bachelor of Applied Science degree in Equine Studies. During her first year at Charles Sturt, she broke her L4-L6 lumbar vertebrae in a horse riding accident. She was airlifted to Royal North Shore Hospital, where she was diagnosed as an incomplete paraplegic. She returned to Charles Sturt to complete her degree, assisted by a 2006 ParaQuad scholarship, and graduated in 2007. In 2010, she began studying for a Bachelor of Veterinary Science degree at Sydney University, where she received a Sydney University Sports and Fitness Elite Athlete Program scholarship.

Wheelchair basketball

Club 
De Wit is classified as a  3.0 point player. She began playing wheelchair basketball in 2007. She joined with the Sydney-based Hills Hornets, who won the Women's National Wheelchair Basketball League (WNWBL) title in 2007, 2008 and 2009. Renamed the Sydney University Flames team in 2010, the team were league champions again that year.

National 
De Wit made her international debut playing for the Under 25 team in the Under 25 Women's Wheelchair Basketball World Championships in Canada in 2011, winning a silver medal. In 2012, she trained with Porto Torres, an Italian team. She made her debut with the senior team, known as the Gliders, at the Osaka Cup in Japan in February 2013, where the Gliders successfully defended the trophy they had won in 2008, 2009, 2010 and 2012. In October 2013, she was selected to play at the  International Wheelchair Basketball Federation (IWBF) Asia/Oceania Championships in Thailand in November 2013.

References 

1987 births
Living people
Australian women's wheelchair basketball players
Charles Sturt University alumni
People from the Central Coast (New South Wales)
Basketball players from New South Wales